Live Rescue (stylized as Live + Rescue) is an American television program on the A&E Network. It follows live camera crew ride-alongs with fire departments and rescue squads in cities and towns across the country. The series is a spin-off of Live PD.

The show was originally hosted by Ashleigh Banfield. For the second season, Matt Iseman took over as host. The show last aired live episodes in early 2021.

Production
In 2019, A&E began developing a spin-off of Live PD called Live Rescue focusing on emergency rescue calls as opposed to police calls. Ashleigh Banfield was the first host of the series. The series received an initial eight episode order and premiered on April 22, 2019. A bonus episode of the series aired on May 9 bringing the episode count up to nine episodes. A&E later ordered an additional ten episodes bringing the final episode count to nineteen.

Live Rescue also has its own spin-offs entitled Live Rescue: Rewind  and Live Rescue: Emergency Response. Live Rescue: Rewind highlights segments from formerly aired episodes of Live Rescue and airs in the same format of Live PD: Rewind. Live Rescue: Emergency Response is a half hour show which shows highlights from Live Rescue and interviews with the fire fighters and emergency medical technicians featured.

For the second season, Matt Iseman took over as host. Season 2 premiered on September 23, 2019.

In March 2020, the show was put on temporary hiatus due to the COVID-19 pandemic. The show moved to Friday and Saturday nights for the third season, which premiered on August 21, 2020. On October 23, 2020, the show changed from its two-hour format to three hours, and began broadcasting only on Fridays.

Episodes

See also
 Critical Rescue
 Rescue 911
 Boston EMS

References

External links
 
 

2010s American reality television series
2020s American reality television series
2019 American television series debuts
English-language television shows
American television spin-offs
A&E (TV network) original programming
Live PD
Television series about firefighting
Television productions suspended due to the COVID-19 pandemic
Reality television spin-offs